Newport Harbor Yacht Club is a yacht club located on the Balboa Peninsula, which is a neighborhood of the city of Newport Beach, Orange County, California.

Facilities 

The Newport Harbor Yacht Club facility has a main dining room and outdoor seating, a private beach, and a pavilion equipped with a barbecue and snack bar.  There are mooring cans, plus both wet and dry slips available for members and guests. The wet slips can accommodate boats up to 55 feet in length, and the dry slips are for smaller boats up to 25 feet in length. The club is open 5 days a week, plus a full-time dock staff and shore boat. The club has applied for a building permit to replace their 1919 clubhouse with a larger, modern building.

The Newport Harbor Yacht Club also leases Moonstone cove on Santa Catalina Island.

Fleets 
Newport Harbor Yacht Club is home to multiple fleets, many of which race regularly.  There are fleets of Naples Sabots, FJs, Stars, Harbor 20s, Finns, Lehman 12s and an adult women's Sabot fleet.  Most of the larger boats race outside of Newport Harbor in the Pacific Ocean.

Regattas 

The Newport Harbor Yacht Club is the home of  many national and international regattas each year.
Bi-annual Newport Beach to Cabo San Lucas race 
Sabot Nationals  
Baldwin Cup Team Race
Star North Americans
Snipe North American Championship in 1991

Eagle Foundation (USA) 
1987 Americas Cup Contender "Eagle"

Junior sailing program 
Newport Harbor Yacht Club has a  junior sailing program, which consists of a full-time junior program director, coaches, maintenance and administrative staff. Facilities include a junior clubhouse, tool room, Sabot and Laser storage spaces, sail and boat wash areas a launching ramp and two cranes.

See also 

List of International Council of Yacht Clubs members

References

External links 
 Official site

Yacht clubs in the United States
America's Cup yacht clubs
1917 establishments in California
Sailing in Newport Beach, California
Organizations based in Orange County, California